

Incumbents 

 Monarch: Charles III
 Governor-General: Rodney Williams
 Prime Minister: Gaston Browne

Events 
Ongoing — COVID-19 pandemic in Antigua and Barbuda

 18 January – 2023 Antiguan general election: Citizens in Antigua and Barbuda headed to the polls to elect members of the House of Representatives. The Labour Party retains its majority.

References 

 
2020s in Antigua and Barbuda
Years of the 21st century in Antigua and Barbuda
Antigua and Barbuda
Antigua and Barbuda